Anita Killi (born 17 January 1968 in Stavanger) is a Norwegian animator and film director.

Background and work 
Anita Killi studied graphic design and illustration at the Norwegian National Academy of Craft and Art Industry (SHKS) in Oslo between 1988 and 1990 and animation at Volda University College between 1990 and 1992. She mastered in animation at SHKS in 1996. She also studied in Estonia.

Anita Killi has made several award-winning animated films, among others The Hedge of Thorns (2001), distinguished as the Norwegian film to win the most international awards in 2002. In addition to animated art shorts, she has also made animated commercials and sequences in documentaries and industrial films. In 2009 she completed the animated film Angry Man. The film, dealing with domestic violence, is based on Gro Dahle and Svein Nyhus's picture book of the same title. As of 2011, the film had been shown on almost one hundred film festivals and won over forty awards, reportedly making Anita Killi the most awarded filmmaker in the world in 2010.

Since 1995, Killi runs the animation studio Trollfilm AS from her family's farm in Dovre. The technique employed in most of her films is a combination of cutouts and object animation in multiplane technique, i.e. animation filmed in several planes.

Killi mentions Yuri Norstein and Michaël Dudok de Wit as sources of inspiration.

Selected filmography 
 1992: Glassballen, 4 min. (director)
 1994: Sirkel, 5 min. (animator)
 1996: Lávrasiid Áigi or Solens datter (international title Daughter of the Sun), 12 min. (director)
 1997: Langt, langt borte (Far, Far Away), 4 min. (animator)
 1999: Kongen som ville ha mer enn en krone (The King Who Wanted More than One Crown)
 2001: Tornehekken (The Hedge of Thorns), 13 min. (director)
 2009: Sinna mann (Angry Man), animation based on the picture book Sinna Mann

References

External links 
Anita Killi at Trollfilm
 
Anita Killi at the Norwegian Film Institute

1968 births
Living people
People from Dovre
People from Stavanger
Oslo National Academy of the Arts alumni
Volda University College alumni
Norwegian expatriates in Estonia
Norwegian animators
Norwegian film directors
Norwegian women animators
Norwegian animated film directors
Norwegian women film directors
Norwegian illustrators
Norwegian women illustrators